Yevhen Yevhenovych Prodanov (born 24 January 1998) is a Ukrainian professional footballer who plays as a left winger for Ukrainian club Trostianets.

References

External links
 
 

1998 births
Living people
Sportspeople from Mariupol
Ukrainian footballers
Association football forwards
FC Shakhtar Donetsk players
FC Illichivets-2 Mariupol players
FC Mariupol players
FC Metalist 1925 Kharkiv players
FC Yarud Mariupol players
FC Trostianets players
Ukrainian Premier League players
Ukrainian First League players
Ukrainian Second League players
Ukrainian Amateur Football Championship players